Audubon Trolley Station is a historic trolley station located at Wilmington, New Hanover County, North Carolina. It was built in 1911, and is a small reinforced concrete shelter in the Mission Revival style.  It consists of four reinforced concrete walls radiating out from a central point to form a Greek cross in plan.  The replacement roof is covered by rounded terra cotta tile glazed with a green color.  The trolley line to Wrightsville Beach ceased operating in 1940.

It was listed on the National Register of Historic Places in 1993.

References

Railway stations on the National Register of Historic Places in North Carolina
Colonial Revival architecture in North Carolina
Buildings and structures completed in 1911
Buildings and structures in Wilmington, North Carolina
National Register of Historic Places in New Hanover County, North Carolina
Former railway stations in North Carolina